Bon Cop, Bad Cop 2 is a 2017 Canadian action comedy film directed by Alain DesRochers. A sequel to the 2006 film Bon Cop, Bad Cop, it stars Colm Feore and Patrick Huard in a reprisal of their original roles. Filmed in Montreal with a budget of $10 million, the film bombed, earning $7 million at the box office, but was also one of the highest-grossing Canadian films of 2017. The film was nominated for Achievement in Make-up at the 2018 Canadian Screen Awards.

Plot

David Bouchard (Huard) steals a car at a car meet up, and drives it into a chop-shop garage. Shortly after, police burst in to arrest the gang. David begins wrestling with an officer who turns out to be Martin Ward (Feore), his old partner. As they fight, David explains that he has been working undercover for over a year for the Sûreté du Québec, and they concoct a plan to allow David to escape realistically, preserving his cover. When Bouchard calls them partners, Ward corrects him, noting that he gives the orders since he is in the Royal Canadian Mounted Police, a federal law enforcement agency. After David crashes a get-away car, Ward shoots him, and Bouchard flees to his ex-wife's house, where he drinks coffee and takes ecstasy to back up his cover story to mob leadership. The next day, Bouchard returns to the mob's headquarters, where he is viewed with suspicion until a doctor takes a blood sample that shows amphetamines and caffeine in his blood system, in line with his story. 

David returns to stealing cars for Sylvio Dipietro (Jenkins) and Mike Dubois (Beaupre), Dipietro's fixer, and Dipietro announces that they need 30 cars in 5 days. In their meetings at Ward's operation's headquarters, a disused curling arena, Bouchard meets the rest of Ward's team, particularly MC (Mazza), the tech whiz. To assist in their efforts to figure out why Dipietro needs so many cars so quickly, MC gives Bouchard an earpiece that allows him to stay in contact with Ward, and a cigarette with a camera at the end, since Bouchard usually has a cigarette tucked behind his ear. Bouchard returns to the chop-shop having stolen Carey Price's pick-up truck complete with his goalie mask. Realizing that this could throw Price off his game and affect the Montreal Canadiens, Bouchard seeks out someone he can trust to return the mask to the goalkeeper. Bouchard also manages to video the chop-shop's computer set up, which enables MC to hack the system and gain access to cameras and microphones in the chop-shop. That night at a strip club run by Dubois and where Bouchard is staying after the raid, the customers behind the mysterious order for stolen cars are meeting with DiPietro. Bouchard contrives a way to catch footage of the three men with his secret cigarette camera, but afterwards, on the street to smoke with Dubois, he lights the cigarette, which sparks. Ward follows the car with the three mysterious customers, and they return to the United States Consulate General in Montreal. When Ward returns to the Consulate the next day to investigate, he is stonewalled and told to come back another day. 

Bouchard's daughter is applying to become a police officer at Nicolet and he sees her regularly. Ward, however, is estranged from his son, Jonathan (Knudsen). When Ward does call Jonathan to share important news apparently related to Ward's health, Jonathan angrily hangs up and tells his father not to call again. 

Dubois, who already hates Bouchard because of his habit of calling Dubois 'Michel', presents evidence to Dipietro that Dubois's escape from Ward was staged. MC and Ward watch this discussion and are able to determine that Bouchard is burned, but when Ward orders Bouchard to break cover, Bouchard refuses and returns to Dipietro's HQ. There, they give him another task, to drive a car to a town in Maine. While Bouchard waits at the designated spot in a busy Maine town, MC and Ward use their access to Dipietro's video and microphone systems to surveil the office, where Dipietro, Dubois, and the three customers are discussing testing a satellite. Realizing that they will use the satellite to detonate a bomb in Bouchard's car, Ward orders Bouchard to run. Bouchard, however, refuses to leave the car at the busy intersection where it might harm innocents, and speeds away. He narrowly escapes the car before the explosion, but is arrested by inept local police. 

After waiting several hours for the FBI to arrive to investigate this apparent act of terrorism, the town sheriff decides to interrogate Bouchard. The sheriff and two other officers find Bouchard's claims to be a French-Canadian police officer unbelievable, since they think Bouchard is contradicting himself when he claims to be both French and Canadian and do not recognize Bouchard's Quebecois dialect as French. Eventually, the FBI, led by Agent Blaine (Apergis), arrive, as does Ward, who the FBI promptly arrests. Handcuffed together in the interrogation room overnight, Ward and Bouchard discuss their lives, and Ward finally reveals that he has been diagnosed with Lou Gehrig's disease, hence his hand tremors. They agree that if they are freed, they will get to the bottom of the car-smuggling mystery, so that Ward can go out a hero, rather than an "old, sick man." The next morning, Agent Blaine lets them go, completely dismissing their warnings about the exploding cars that seem likely to be sent to the United States.  

When Ward and Bouchard return to the curling rink, the find the center empty except for MC, who explains that their superiors shut down the operation and the Dipietro's criminals have left the garage. They decide to push on with their investigation, and find out that the Dubois is still at the strip club he manages. They burst in, and after a confrontation with Dubois, who takes one of the escorts hostage, capture him. They interrogate him in Bouchard's wife's garage, where Dubois eventually breaks down when Ward tells him that he is dying and has nothing to lose, so is doesn't care if Dubois lives through the night. Ward, Bouchard, and Dubois go to the location where the five last exploding cars will depart from. From a sniper's nest, Ward shoots and injures the four of the drivers to prevent them from leaving with their exploding cars, but the last driver is his son, Jonathan. Explosives in the four cars that did not leave detonate, and Ward is distraught, thinking his son is dead. However, Bouchard and MC explain that Jonathan's car did not explode and they still have a chance to save him. 

Ward and Bouchard then go to the US Consulate, where Agent Blaine and the three other conspirators are shown together discussing how their false-flag operation to provoke a renewed war on terror in the United States will make them heroes. When Bouchard shoots his gun in the lobby to cut the queue, Blaine emerges and takes them to his officer, where he explains that they were right, and he has broken up the terrorist plot and seized their computers. However, MC informs Ward over an earpiece that the signal just turned on again, which leads Ward to question Blaine, who then pulls a gun on the duo. They manage to subdue him in his office, and flee in a Consulate car to find the source of the signal that will trigger the exploding cars. They find the armored truck and corner it in an alley, but the man inside the vault shoots himself rather than open the door. Ward commandeers the vehicle and drives off, saying he will drive it into a river to submerge the truck and smother the signal, preventing the explosions, but Bouchard gives chase and manages to climb onto the truck and obstructs Ward's view, so that the truck crashes. They then use a mobile crane to lift the truck and drive it to a canal, where they drop it into the water with seconds to spare, preventing the explosion. In New York, Jonathan calls his father and the senior Ward gives Jonathan instructions about escaping the scene before the police arrive. 

Several months later, Bouchard and Ward, dressed in tuxedos and Ward using a cane, attend a ceremony with the President of the United States, where he awards them the Medal of Honor for their actions saving countless American lives. Jonathan is in the audience, apparently reconciled with his father, and Bouchard's daughter is in a police cadet uniform.

Politics
The film touches on what seems to be a political angle, with some satire thrown at the U.S., but actor Colm Feore expresses that they are trying to convey a sociological message, in that Canadians and Americans have fundamental differences. The actor goes on to say that it's also a jab at Americans for their ignorance of Canadian culture over the years. 
One way this is portrayed in the film, is when local U.S. officers are wary of French speaking cop Huard and question his nationality.

Cast

Production

Huard, a prominent public figure in Quebec, has an extensive background in Canadian entertainment. As screenplay writer, producer, and lead actor, Huard played an active role in the overall production of the film. He was first inspired to write the series original film Bon Cop, Bad Cop during a performed comedic monologue at the Genie Awards in 2003. The actor played on linguistic and cultural differences, and realized those were the very things that perhaps separated, and also united Franco and Anglo-Canadian audiences. He claims "The one thing we can laugh about together is our differences. That's when I had a flash for Bon Cop."

Production of the film began in Montreal and the Eastern Townships (including Richmond in the bridge scene) in May 2016. Unlike the original film, which derived much of its humour from the culture clash between English Canada and Quebec, the sequel's script downplays that aspect in favour of a focus on Canada's relationship with the United States. The cast also includes radio broadcaster John Moore as the President of the United States. Colm Feore claims that "the wonderful thing about the movie is the way it capitalizes on cultural differences for laughs, but never puts one side above the other." This same narrative is carried throughout the sequel, with more humour and action. Screenplay writer Huard says in an interview that there is a much less "combative tone" between the two cops, and that the film also tells a story about friendship.

Michael Madsen was slated to appear in the film as an FBI agent, but was forced to drop out for health reasons and was replaced by Andreas Apergis.

Reception
On review aggregator website Rotten Tomatoes, the film holds a 75% approval rating based on eight reviews, with an average score of 6.1/10.

References

External links

2017 films
2017 action comedy films
Canadian action comedy films
Canadian crime comedy films
Bilingualism in Canada
Films set in Montreal
Films shot in Montreal
Buddy comedy films
2010s buddy cop films
Royal Canadian Mounted Police in fiction
Films directed by Alain DesRochers
Canadian sequel films
Canadian multilingual films
2017 comedy films
2017 multilingual films
French-language Canadian films
2010s English-language films
2010s Canadian films